Lao Che may refer to:
 Lao Che (Indiana Jones), character of the Indiana Jones and the Temple of Doom
 Lao Che (band), a Polish music band